Eilema creatoplaga is a moth of the  subfamily Arctiinae. It is found in the Democratic Republic of Congo, Kenya, South Africa and Uganda.

References

creatoplaga
Moths of Africa
Moths described in 1901